Globus is a Swiss department store company, with 13 department stores in Switzerland. The group, which includes the Herren Globus chain of menswear stores and the Office World chain of office supplies stores, was previously owned by Switzerland's largest retailer, Migros. It is now owned by Central Group and Signa Holding.

Its main branches are located in the three principal cities of Switzerland, i.e. Zürich, Geneva and Basel.

It has been a member of the International Association of Department Stores from 1931 to 2020, with various CEOs acting as presidents of the Association over time.

History

Globus was founded in 1907 in Zürich, and now has stores in all major Swiss cities. The chain sells mostly upscale goods, including clothing, cosmetics, jewelry and household supplies. The stores are noted for their extensive delicatessen section, called Globus Delicatessa, and their former mascot, Globi, the comic books about whom have been a fixture in the childhood of many Swiss.

In 2020, Migros sold its ownership in Globus to KaDeWe Group, which is co-owned by Austrian conglomerate Signa Holding and Thailand's Central Group.

Department stores
There are Globus department stores in:

See also 
 Migros
 Globi

References

External links 
Official Web site

Retail companies established in 1907
Swiss companies established in 1907
Retail companies of Switzerland
Department stores of Switzerland
Companies based in Zürich
Food halls
Migros